Grace Bradley (September 21, 1913 – September 21, 2010) was an American film actress who was active in Hollywood during the 1930s.

Early life
Bradley was born in Brooklyn and was an only child. As a child, she took piano lessons and, by the age of six, she gave her first recital. She attended the Eastman School of Music near Rochester, New York by age 12, after winning a scholarship. Originally, she had wanted to become a professional pianist. While in school, she took dance lessons and played piano.

As one obituary noted, she "played the piano, sang and danced, on stage and in nightclubs, from an early age to help support her widowed mother."

Her grandfather had wanted her to be educated in Berlin, Germany so that she could receive more formal education but a Broadway producer discovered her during one of her dance recitals and hired her for a professional show.

On December 22, 1930, she made her Broadway debut at New York's Hammerstein Theatre in Ballyhoo of 1930. Her next stage appearance came one year later at The Music Box Theatre in The Third Little Show. Soon Bradley found herself working in various New York nightclubs and theatres. In March 1933, she appeared in Strike Me Pink at the Majestic Theatre. She left the show after deciding to give Hollywood a try.

Hollywood
Although she made one film in 1932, her film career did not gather steam until she starred in the film Too Much Harmony (1933), which provided her "first film credit". She was under contract to Paramount Pictures beginning in 1933, and reportedly took home $150 per week.

Her typical roles were described in an obituary: "From 1933 to 1943, she appeared in dozens of quickly made second features, often cast as what were termed 'good-time girls,' as distinct from good girls, sometimes with invented ooh-la-la French names." In the 1930s, she became one of the period's most popular musical stars.

Personal life and post-career activities

In May 1937, Bradley agreed to a blind date and met Hopalong Cassidy star William Boyd. The two of them hit it off so well that they married the next month. The union was happy but childless. In the 1940s, Bradley's star began to wane and, in 1943, she starred in her last big role in Taxi, Mister. Following this film, Bradley had officially played out her Paramount contract, and she spent the remainder of the 1940s alongside her husband, traveling around the country with him helping promote his cowboy image. She made one more film appearance, an uncredited cameo role in Tournament of Roses (1954).

Bradley was a Republican and supported the campaign of Dwight Eisenhower during the 1952 presidential election.

Following Boyd's death on September 12, 1972, Bradley retired from the entertainment world, but still continued to do things to help keep Boyd's memory alive. She also endured years of fighting for the legal rights to her late husband's 66 "Hopalong Cassidy" features. With her acting career behind her, she devoted her time to volunteer work at the Laguna Beach Hospital where her husband had spent his final days.

Death
Grace Bradley Boyd died on her 97th birthday in 2010. Two days later, private services were held at Forest Lawn Memorial Park in Glendale, California, where she was interred with her husband in the Great Mausoleum, Sanctuary of Sacred Promise.

Filmography
 Too Much Harmony (1933) - Verne La Mond
 The Way to Love (1933) - Sunburned Lady
 Girl Without a Room (1933) - Nada
 Six of a Kind (1934) - Goldie
 Wharf Angel (1934) - Saloon Girl
 Come on Marines! (1934) - JoJo La Verne
 She Made Her Bed (1934) - Eve Richards
 The Cat's-Paw (1934) - Dolores Doce
 Redhead (1934) - Dale Carter
 The Gilded Lily (1935) - Daisy
 Stolen Harmony (1935) - Jean Loring
 Old Man Rhythm (1935) - Marion Beecher
 Two-Fisted (1935) - Marie
 Rose of the Rancho (1936) - Flossie
 Anything Goes (1936) - Bonnie LeTour
 Dangerous Waters (1936) - Joan Marlowe
 Thirteen Hours by Air (1936) - Trixie La Brey
 F-Man (1936) - Evelyn
 Three Cheers for Love (1936) - Eve Bronson
 Sitting on the Moon (1936) - Polly Blair
 Don't Turn 'Em Loose (1936) - Grace Forbes
 Larceny on the Air (1937) - Jean Sterling
 O.H.M.S. (1937) - Jean Burdett
 Roaring Timber (1937) - Kay MacKinley
 Wake Up and Live (1937) - Jean Roberts
 Blazing Glory (1937)
 It's All Yours (1937) - Constance Marlowe
 The Big Broadcast of 1938 (1938) - Grace Fielding
 Romance on the Run (1938) - Lily Lamont
 Roaring Timber (1938)
 The Invisible Killer (1939) - Sue Walker
 Sign of the Wolf (1941) - Judy Weston
 The Hard-Boiled Canary (1941) - Madie Duvalie
 Brooklyn Orchid (1942) - Sadie McGuerin
 The McGuerins from Brooklyn (1943) - Sadie McGuerin
 Taxi, Mister (1943)

References

Further reading
 Boyd, Grace Bradley and Cochran, Michael (2008) Hopalong Cassidy: An American Legend Gemstone, York, Pennsylvania;

External links

 
 
 Hopalong Cassidy's Widow, Grace Boyd, dies, sfgate.com; retrieved September 24, 2010.
 Grace Bradley Boyd Tribute, americanmusicpreservation.com; accessed August 7, 2015.

1913 births
2010 deaths
20th-century American actresses
American musical theatre actresses
American film actresses
Musicians from Brooklyn
Actresses from New York City
American female dancers
American tap dancers
American ballroom dancers
American women singers
Torch singers
American radio actresses
American television actresses
Eastman School of Music alumni
American memoirists
American women memoirists
American socialites
Burials at Forest Lawn Memorial Park (Glendale)
New York (state) Republicans
California Republicans
21st-century American women